CLEAPSS is an advisory service in the United Kingdom providing support in science and technology for a consortium of local authorities and their schools including establishments for pupils with special needs.

Independent schools, post-16 colleges, teacher training establishments, curriculum developers and others can apply for associate membership. CLEAPSS offers help from nursery education through to A-level studies or equivalent.

CLEAPSS first started in 1963 as CLEAPSE (Consortium of Local Education Authorities for the Provision of Science Equipment). In 1988 the name was changed to CLEAPSS (Consortium of Local Education Authorities for the Provision of Science Services) to reflect a change of emphasis from equipment to a range of services. Since then, Local Education Authorities became Local Authorities (LAs) and CLEAPSS' services expanded to include D&T, so CLEAPSS was registered as a Trade Mark. CLEAPSS is now simply a name and not an acronym.

People served 
CLEAPSS serves:

    teachers (including head teachers),
    technicians,
    science advisers/inspectors/consultants,
    teacher trainers,
    health and safety advisers,
    architects (working for subscribers),
    other local authority officers,
    school governors.

Areas covered 
CLEAPSS covers:

    health and safety including model risk assessments,
    chemicals, living organisms, equipment,
    sources of resources,
    laboratory design, facilities and fittings,
    technicians and their jobs,
    D&T facilities and fittings.

CLEAPSS provides support for a consortium of local authorities. It is controlled by its members, which currently include all LAs throughout the British Isles (not Scotland) (100% of those eligible).

Associate members 
CLEAPSS has around 2,000 associate members, i.e.:

    foundation and voluntary-aided schools (where not a member via a local authority),
    independent schools,
    incorporated colleges,
    teacher-training establishments and science learning centres,
    overseas institutions,
    field centres, museums, etc,
    curriculum developers.

Services provided 
CLEAPSS provides:

    termly newsletters for primary and secondary schools,
    a wide range of free publications,
    model risk assessments,
    special risk assessments,
    low-cost training courses for technicians, teachers and local authority officers,
    a telephone helpline which takes nearly 7,000 calls per year,
    a monitoring service, e.g. for mercury spills,
    evaluations of equipment,
    advice on repairs,
    a H&S / Review service for publishers, exam. boards and other organisations producing teaching resources.

See also 

 Education in the UK
 Science education

References

External links 

Brunel University London
Education advocacy groups
Education in the London Borough of Hillingdon
Organisations based in the London Borough of Hillingdon
Science education in the United Kingdom